Fambach is a municipality in the district Schmalkalden-Meiningen, in Thuringia, Germany. Since 1 December 2008 it has incorporated the former municipality of Heßles.

History
From 1868 to 1944, Fambach was part of the Prussian Province of Hesse-Nassau.

References

Schmalkalden-Meiningen